Mary Sybilla Lovell is a British writer, daughter of William G. and Mary Catherine (née Wooley) Shelton. She married Clifford C. Lovell on 22 October 1960. They divorced in 1974. She married Geoffrey A. H. Watts on 11 July 1992. She has one child: Graeme R. Lovell.

She was an accountant and company director until she began writing in 1980 following a serious riding accident which left her temporarily disabled.

She has written biographies of Beryl Markham, Amelia Earhart, Jane Digby, Richard Francis Burton, Amy Elizabeth Thorpe, the Mitford Girls, Bess of Hardwick and the Churchills. Her book on Markham, Straight on Till Morning, researched and written in under a year, after weeks of interviews with the subject in Nairobi, became an immediate international bestseller when it was published in 1987 and was twelve weeks on the New York Times Best Seller list.

She also wrote The Mitford Girls (titled The Sisters in the USA), a biography of the celebrated Mitford sisters, first published in September 2001 (paperback August 2002), and her Bess of Hardwick, was published in the UK in 2005. Four of her books have been optioned for films.

Until 2011 she often led reader groups interested in Jane Digby around Syria to follow in the footsteps of this favourite subject of hers.  She loves to travel to the Middle East.

Amelia, a major movie starring Richard Gere and Hilary Swank, was based on her bestselling book The Sound of Wings - a biography of Amelia Earhart. It was released in October 2009.

Her last biography was The Churchills,  a biography of the Churchill family from the 1st Duke Marlborough to the present generation, was published in April 2011 in the UK and May 2011 in the U.S.A. The paperback was due for release in April/May 2012.

She lives in the New Forest, Hampshire.

List of biographies by subject

Beryl Markham - Straight on till Morning (1987)
Beryl Markham’s African stories - The Splendid Outcast (1988)
Amelia Earhart - The Sound of Wings (1989 & 2009)
Amy Elizabeth Thorpe - Cast No Shadow; Women in WW II Espionage (1992)
Jane Digby - A Scandalous Life (1995)
Sir Richard and Isabel Burton - A Rage to Live (1998)
Mitford sisters - The Mitford Girls – the extraordinary lives of the six Mitford sisters (2001)
Bess of Hardwick – Empire Builder and First Lady of Chatsworth (2005)
Winston Churchill - The Churchills: In Love and War (2011)
Maxine Elliott - The Riviera Set (2016)

External links
Mary S. Lovell's internet website
 Lovell, Mary S(ybilla) 1941 in Contemporary Authors, New Revision Series (Highbeam Research)

British writers
Living people
British biographers
Year of birth missing (living people)